Harshdeep Kaur (born 16 December 1986) is an Indian playback singer known for her Bollywood Hindi, Punjabi,English and Sufi songs. She is popularly known as "Sufi Ki Sultana" because of her soulful Sufi renditions. After winning titles in two reality shows, Kaur established herself as a lead singer in Bollywood soundtracks. Kaur was sixteen years old when she released her first Bollywood song, "Sajna Mai Haari".

Kaur has recorded songs for film music in multiple Indian languages, including Hindi, Punjabi, Malayalam, Tamil and Urdu, and has established herself as a leading playback singer of Indian cinema. She has worked with leading music directors(including A R Rahman, Pritam Chakraborty, Vishal–Shekhar, Salim–Sulaiman, Shankar–Ehsaan–Loy, Amit Trivedi, Shantanu Moitra, Tanishk Bagchi, Himesh Reshammiya, Sanjay Leela Bhansali, Sohail Sen. She's one of the very few Indian singers to have sung for a Hollywood film. Her track R.I.P., composed by AR Rahman, was a part of Oscar-winning director Danny Boyle's film 127 Hours. She has also sung a few songs for the Pakistani film and television industry.

Some of her popular songs include Katiya Karun from Rockstar; Dilbaro from Raazi; Heer from Jab Tak Hai Jaan; Ik Onkar from Rang De Basanti; Zaalima from Raees; Nachde Ne Saare from Baar Baar Dekho; Bari Barsi from Band Baaja Baaraat; Kabira from Yeh Jawani Hai Deewani; Jugni ji from Cocktail; and Twist Kamariya from Bareilly ki Barfi.

In 2019, Kaur received the IIFA Award for Best Female Playback Singer award at the 20th IIFA Awards for the song "Dilbaro" from the film Raazi. She also won the Star Screen Award, Zee Cine Award for the same song Dilbaro.

Early life
Kaur was born on 16 December 1986 to Savinder Singh in Delhi. She is from a musical background. Her father, Savinder Singh, owns a factory of musical instruments. She attended Springdales School in New Delhi. Apart from studying, she started learning music at the age of six. She learned Indian classical music from Mr. Tejpal Singh, popularly known as the Singh Brothers, and Western classical music from George Pullinkala, Delhi Music Theatre. Later, at the age of twelve, to explore the world of music, she joined the Delhi School of Music to learn piano.
 n n n n

Career

Television
Kaur won the singing competition  MTV’s Video Ga Ga in 2003. In 2008 she won Junoon – Kuch Kar Dikhaane Ka. She competed from the Sufi Ki Sultan genre with Rahat Nusrat Fateh Ali Khan as her mentor. 

She sang the title song of TV series Bani – Ishq Da Kalma in 2013. Kaur is the only singer who has appeared on all four seasons of Coke Studio (India) from 2011 to 2015.

Harshdeep Kaur became a "Coach" on StarPlus singing reality show ''The Voice India. She was joined by Adnan Sami, Kanika Kapoor and Armaan Malik as the other coaches and by "Super Guru" A. R. Rahman.

Personal life
Kaur married her childhood friend Mankeet Singh in a traditional Sikh wedding ceremony on 20 March 2015 in Mumbai. The couple's first child, Hunar Singh was born on 2 March 2021.

Television appearances
Coke Studio (India) on MTV :
Season 1 – Hoo (Music recreated by Leslie Lewis) in 2011
Season 2 – Nirmohiya (Music by Amit Trivedi) & Hey Ri (Music by Hitesh Sonik) in 2012
Season 3 – Dinae Dinae with Papon in 2013
Season 4 – Teriyan Tu Jaane (Amit Trivedi) in 2015
As a judge on The Voice, a singing reality show on StarPlus in 2019.Her team won the reality show.
The opening ceremony of IPL in 2017.
Special performance at the Global Indian Music Academy Awards in 2016.
MTV Unplugged: Aaj din Chadeya with Pritam

Concerts and tours 

2013
 In April she headlined the Southbank Centre Music Festival in London, alongside Soul/Bollywood singer Ash King.
 In August she headlined the Mosaic Festival held in Mississauga, Canada.
 In September she performed at the London Mela in Gunnersbury Park.

2014
 AAS Concert at Purana Qila with Attaullah Khan.
 MTV Unplugged Concert with Shafqat Amanat Ali Khan
 Live in Concert with Pritam at Wembley Arena, London, Dubai & Singapore
 Infinite Love Concerts with AR Rahman in Singapore and Malaysia

2015
 Performed with her band at the Stardust Concert held at the Royal Festival Hall in London in September 2015

2016
 Performed at the Heart of Asia Conference held in Amritsar in the presence of Prime Minister Narendra Modi and other Asian leaders in 2016
 Hazaaron Khwahishein Aisi with Shekhar Ravjiani at The Esplanade in Singapore in September 2016

2017
 First Indian singer to become a headliner at the Manchester International Festival in June 2017.
 Headlined "Sounds Of Sufi" Concert at the Esplanade in Singapore in November 2017
 Leading performers of the AR Rahman Encore tour in India 2017
 Her Solo UK tour in March 2018 was a huge success and garnered a lot of appreciation from the music industry and her fans.
 She has performed with the Legendary Punjabi singer "Gurdas Mann" in 2015 & 2018 in New Delhi.

2018
 She was the leading performer on Pritam's First-ever North American Tour in April 2018.
 She opened for Bryan Adams' on his India tour on 12 October(Mumbai) and 14 October (Delhi) in 2018.
Performed for Ranveer Singh & Deepika Padukone's Wedding in Lake Como, Italy.

2019
Headlining performer at the  "Jashn-e-Rekhta" Festival held in Delhi.
Headlined Konark Festival in Orissa

Discography

Film songs

Other songs

Awards and nominations

Reality competitions
Winner, MTV Video GaGa Contest (2001)
Winner, NDTV Imagine's JUNOON Kuchh Kar Dikhane Ka (2008)
Winner, Aao Jhoomein Gaayein (SAB TV)
Winner, SAREGAMA Punjabi (Alpha TV)

Notes

References

External links 

 
 

1986 births
Living people
21st-century Indian women singers
21st-century Indian singers
Bollywood playback singers
Indian female classical dancers
Indian women playback singers
Indian folk-pop singers
Screen Awards winners
Zee Cine Awards winners
International Indian Film Academy Awards winners
Performers of Indian classical dance
Singers from Delhi
Women musicians from Delhi